Miles in Berlin is an album recorded on September 25, 1964, by the Miles Davis Quintet at the Berliner Philharmonie, Berlin, Germany.  It was released in the United States on CD in 2005 and marks the first recorded work of what is commonly known as Miles Davis's ‘Second Great Quintet’ with tenor saxophonist Wayne Shorter, pianist Herbie Hancock, bassist Ron Carter and drummer Tony Williams.

Track listing

Original LP track List

Side 1
 "Milestones" (Miles Davis) – 7:56
 "Autumn Leaves" (Joseph Kosma, Jacques Prévert, Johnny Mercer) – 12:46

Side 2
 "So What" (Miles Davis) – 10:38
 "Walkin'" (Richard H. Carpenter) – 10:36
 "Theme" (Miles Davis) – 1:48

Reissue CD(COL 519507 2, 2005) track List
 "Milestones" (Miles Davis) – 8:57
 "Autumn Leaves" (Joseph Kosma, Jacques Prévert, Johnny Mercer) – 12:37
 "So What" (Miles Davis) – 10:27
 "Stella by Starlight" (Victor Young, Ned Washington) - 12:53
 "Walkin'" (Richard H. Carpenter) – 10:39
 "Go-Go [Theme] and Announcement" (Miles Davis) – 1:44

Personnel
 Miles Davis – trumpet
 Wayne Shorter – tenor saxophone
 Herbie Hancock – piano
 Ron Carter – double bass
 Tony Williams – drums

Production
 Original Producer - Rudy Wolpert
 Recording Produced - SFB Radio, Berlin
 Cover Photography - Rudy Wolpert
 Reissue Producer - Michael Cuscuna and Bob Belden
 Remastered - Mark Wilder at Sony Music Studios, New York, NY.

References

Albums produced by Michael Cuscuna
Albums produced by Bob Belden
Miles Davis live albums
1964 live albums
Columbia Records live albums